8 Thottakkal is a 2017 Indian Tamil-language crime thriller film written and directed by Sri Ganesh. Produced by Vellapandian, the film stars his son Vetri, alongside an ensemble cast including Aparna Balamurali, Nassar and M. S. Bhaskar and Meera Mithun. Principal photography of the film commenced in August 2016 at Chennai and was completed in November 2016. The film released on 7 April 2017. This movie, which was loosely inspired by the 1949 Japanese movie Stray Dog  was remade in Kannada in 2018 as 8MM Bullet  and in Telugu in 2021 as Senapathi.

Plot
The film starts with an orphaned boy, Sathya, getting framed by the employer for the murder of his wife and is sent to juvenile. He befriends the warden, who helps him secure the sub inspector job.

Sathya remembers what his warden taught him and stays honest in his profession. Unlike the other policemen at his station, he refuses to be involved in bribes and is made an outcast. One day, Sathya helps a writer who is beaten by his corrupt inspector, Gunasekaran. Thinking that Sathya is trying to become a hero by making him look bad, Guna plans to shame Sathya. Guna then arranges for Sathya to shadow a dangerous gangster. While shadowing the gangster, he loses his gun, fully loaded with 8 bullets. Guna gives Sathya one day to find his lost gun or face disciplinary action.

With the help of a reporter friend, Meera, Sathya nabs the boy who pickpocketed his gun, but the boy has sold the gun. The guy who bought the gun attempts a bank robbery along with two other men, and in the process, he accidentally shoots and kills a little girl. Meera, in danger of losing her job, tells her superiors about the case, it goes viral, and Sathya is suspended from duty. Sathya hides from the police as he will be arrested, and is tracked down by Pandian, the new handler of the case. Pandian says that if Sathya was a real policeman, he should never stop searching, which causes Sathya to join him.

Meanwhile, one of the robbers tries to buy his girlfriend a necklace for her birthday and takes all the fresh notes available, despite the boss's opposition. In the jewelry shop, he is exposed as the police kept track of the serial number of the fresh notes. He escapes the arrest and goes to get his share. After a confrontation with the boss, he tries to steal all the money and the leader shoots and kills him. The remaining two dispose of the body. The second robber, fearing he also will be shot dead by the boss, contacts the police. When the police attempt to arrest the boss with a ploy, the boss shoots and kills the second robber and made sure there is no one left to connect him with the robber.

Sathya meets an old policeman, Krishnamurthy, who got suspended for letting a terrorist slip away as a constable. It turns out that Guna accepted a bribe from the terrorist and let him go, but this has already ruined Murthy's profession. Sathya talks to Murthy about life and how things have changed. After this, Murthy sees the man who sold him the gun and leaves. Murthy kills him with the same gun when he follows Murthy to a restroom. However, we learn that Murthy is actually the leader of the robbery, and he kills the officer who did not sanction his Provident Fund. Sathya, now looking for clues in the murder, finds Murthy's application sanctioned and goes to his house to give it to him. However, Murthy's son tells him that the application got sanctioned earlier, and Murthy gave the money to the family, by connecting the murder of the guy who sold the gun and Murthy's son's statement, he figures out that Murthy is the robber and the boss.

Meanwhile, Murthy follows Guna to a bank and attempts another robbery and kills him, after which he throws the money on the street. When Murthy returns home, he finds out that the police have surrounded him. Pandian takes Murthy's grandson hostage, and there is a confrontation in which Sathya walks out with his gun . He later tells the investigation board that Murthy shot Pandian dead and Sathya had killed Murthy in self-defense. Sathya is given his job back.

As Sathya drives with Meera, she tells him that he should not feel bad for Murthy as he was a bad person. We are shown what actually happens in that room. Pandian, with his gun on Murthy's grandson's head, slips, and a shot is fired. Murthy, in shock, shoots and kills Pandian, but it turns out that Pandian missed and did not hit Murthy's grandson. Sathya grabs Murthy and fights him but cannot hurt him as he feels sorry for him. Murthy stands up, grabs the gun, and tells Sathya to shoot him. He then explains that he did not tell his family about his cancer because he heard the family speaking about why God did not take him instead of his wife. He then says he robbed the bank for them and that he wanted to live his last days like a king. Murthy also says he did not mean to shoot the child and breaks down. Murthy grabs Sathya's hands, puts the gun to his forehead and says he does not want to put the family in shame by going to prison. He then shoots himself dead with the last bullet when Sathya hesitates.

After this flashback, at a stoplight, Sathya sees the employer that framed him, on the side of the street, and the movie ends.

Cast

Production 
After working under director Mysskin as an assistant director in Onaayum Aattukkuttiyum (2013), Sri Ganesh started working on his script, which he revealed to be a cop thriller. Talking about the film, Sri Ganesh said that since it is a film about criminals trying to take advantage of a specific situation, it allowed him to understand the mindset of police officers. Ganesh attributed parts of the film to real-life incidents and literature, citing he was interested by the mystery series of Inspector Martin Beck. For the film, he also spent time speaking to the cop who was part of the 2012 Velachery encounters, where five men suspected of robbing banks in the city were shot dead, with Nassar's character in his story being partly based on this policeman. The production began in August 2016 and ended in November 2016, with the film shot almost entirely in Chennai, over a period of 47 days.

Newcomer Vetri was selected to play the lead role of a sub-inspector in the film, with his family producing the film. Actress Aparna Balamurali was signed on as the lead actress soon after the release of her debut Malayalam film Maheshinte Prathikaaram (2016), and revealed that she would play the character of a scribe. Actress Meera Mithun also worked on the film, which became the first film release. Other members of the cast included Nassar and M. S. Bhaskar, while Ranjith, the brother of Kaaka Muttai actor Ramesh, also made his debut as a petty thief.

Soundtrack 

KS Sundaramurthy composed the songs and background score for the film. Yuvan Shankar Raja bought the audio rights of 8 Thottakkal under his banner, U1 Records.

Release 
The film had a theatrical release on 7 April 2017, alongside Mani Ratnam's Kaatru Veliyidai (2017). In their review of the film, Sify.com wrote, "To conclude, 8 Thottakkal definitely has minor flaws including the impassive hero and lengthy second half, but still, the film is a satisfying watch". The reviewer added that "8 Thottakkal has plenty of positive aspects to discuss but two things have certainly reduced the quality of the film, one is the wooden hero who just can't act and the other one is unnecessary song sequences, which comes as speed-breakers", while stating "another issue is the length of the film is a bit of a downer as the long drawn out scene composition tests your patience — but despite these flaws, the film is worth a look and hits the target with the heart touching performance of MS Baskar, who has given his career best". A reviewer from The Times of India noted "Taking the set-up of Akira Kurosawa's Stray Dog, Sri Ganesh gives us a slow-burning cop thriller which changes track halfway and becomes a contemplation on life. It is a risky move because the film starts to empathise more with its antagonist and wants us to do the same as well, but surprisingly, Sri Ganesh manages this feat". The critic added "the director gives us songs that break the mood and momentum of the film" and that "you really are baffled that a director who displays such confidence in letting his film unfurl at a meditative pace would settle for such compromises". A vapid film with a sleepwalking hero cannot recreate the magic of Stray Dog- Kollywood Kapsa.

References

External links
 

2010s Tamil-language films
2017 films
Indian crime thriller films
Films set in Chennai
Films shot in Chennai
2010s police procedural films
Fictional portrayals of the Tamil Nadu Police
Tamil films remade in other languages
Indian remakes of Japanese films
2017 directorial debut films
2017 crime thriller films